This is a list of manga series by volume count of manga series that span at least 40 tankōbon volumes. There are 182 manga series from which 114 series are completed and 68 series are in ongoing serialization. Ongoing series are highlighted in light green.

Series count
The list also notes the number of volumes and chapters, the author, the Japanese magazine in which it was originally serialized and its frequency, publisher and date of release of first and last (latest) volume of respective manga volume.

See also
 List of anime franchises by episode count
 List of anime series by episode count

References

Footnotes

Citations 

Volume count